The 1946 Tipperary Senior Hurling Championship was the 56th staging of the Tipperary Senior Hurling Championship since its establishment by the Tipperary County Board in 1887.

Thurles Sarsfields were the defending champions.

Thurles Sarsfields won the championship after a 4-05 to 0-03 defeat of Carrick Swans in the final. It was their 16th championship title overall and their third title in succession.

References

Tipperary
Tipperary Senior Hurling Championship